The 2016–17 East Superleague (known as the McBookie.com East Superleague for sponsorship reasons) was the 15th season of the East Superleague, the top tier of league competition for SJFA East Region member clubs.

The season began on 6 August 2016 and ended on 3 June 2017. Bonnyrigg Rose Athletic were the reigning champions.

Kelty Hearts clinched the championship on 31 May 2017, the club's second title in three seasons. As winners they entered the preliminary round of the 2017–18 Scottish Cup.

Teams
The following teams changed division prior to the 2016–17 season.

To East Superleague
Promoted from East Premier League
Jeanfield Swifts
Dundonald Bluebell
Lochee United

From East Superleague
Relegated to East Premier League
Sauchie Juniors
St Andrews United
Tayport

Stadia and locations

Managerial changes

League table

Results

East Region Super/Premier League play-off
Forfar West End, who finished third in the East Premier League, defeated Newtongrange Star 3–2 on aggregate in the East Region Super/Premier League play-off to gain promotion. However, Newtongrange were reprieved from relegation to balance league numbers following the departure of Kelty Hearts to the East of Scotland Football League.

References

6
East Superleague seasons